Battle of Ceuta may refer to:

 Battle of Ceuta (1309), a battle between Aragon and Granada in Ceuta in 1309
 Portuguese conquest of Ceuta, the Portuguese capture of Ceuta from Morocco in 1415

See also
 Siege of Ceuta (disambiguation)